Kenneth Vanbilsen (born 1 June 1990 in Herk-de-Stad) is a Belgian former cyclist, who competed as a professional from 2011 to 2022. He was named in the start list for the 2015 Tour de France, winning the combativity award on stage ten.

Major results

2008
 1st Trofee der Vlaamse Ardennen
 7th Paris–Roubaix Juniors
2011
 Ronde van Vlaams-Brabant
1st Stages 2 & 5
 3rd Flèche Ardennaise
 9th Grote Prijs Jef Scherens
2012
 1st Ronde van Vlaanderen Beloften
 2nd Circuit de Wallonie
 2nd Brustem Sint-Truiden
 3rd ZLM Tour
 3rd Jeuk–Gingelom
 7th Memorial Rik Van Steenbergen
 7th Ronde van Limburg
 7th Kattekoers
 8th Road race, UCI Under-23 Road World Championships
 10th Nationale Sluitingsprijs
2013
 1st  Mountains classification Tour des Fjords
 2nd Internationale Wielertrofee Jong Maar Moedig
 3rd Druivenkoers Overijse
 7th Overall Tour de l'Eurométropole
 8th Gooikse Pijl
 9th Dutch Food Valley Classic
2014
 1st Grand Prix d'Ouverture La Marseillaise
 1st  Combativity classification Eneco Tour
 2nd Classic Loire Atlantique
 2nd Stadsprijs Geraardsbergen
 5th Grote Prijs Jef Scherens
 6th Grand Prix de la Somme
 10th Overall Tour de Picardie
 10th Ronde van Limburg
2015
 2nd Grand Prix La Marseillaise
 9th Overall Ster ZLM Toer
  Combativity award Stage 10 Tour de France
2016
 4th Classic Loire Atlantique
2017
 1st  Combativity classification Tour of Belgium
 8th Polynormande
 8th Dwars door het Hageland
2019
 1st Dwars door het Hageland
2022
 6th Scheldeprijs

Grand Tour general classification results timeline

References

External links

1990 births
Living people
Belgian male cyclists
People from Herk-de-Stad
Cyclists from Limburg (Belgium)